Project Alpha is a British Metropolitan Police Service intelligence gathering initiative set up in June 2019. One of the functions of the initiative is gathering information from social media. Its activities have included monitoring videos released by the UK drill music scene.

According to The Guardian, it has been involved in large-scale gathering of information about children.

References

See also 
 Predictive policing

Metropolitan Police operations
2019 establishments
Mass surveillance in the United Kingdom
UK drill